Erik Rubín Milanszenko (born 30 January 1971) is a Mexican singer and actor. He was a member of the Mexican teen pop group Timbiriche.

Early career
At the age of 12, Rubín joined the group Timbiriche, one of the most important and influential pop bands of the 1980s on the Spanish language charts.  His entry into the group transformed it into a septet. His first album with the group was their fourth album. While with the group, he recorded more than 10 albums, participated in several television specials, and visited various countries during their concert tours.  He is best known for hits such as "Mágico amor", "Ámame hasta con los dientes" and "Princesa Tibetana".

Rubín remained with Timbiriche until 1991. The last Timbiriche album he worked on was their tenth. In 1998 he joined on Timbiriche reunion and he wrote new songs for the album El Concierto, which he co-produced. In 2007, for the 25th anniversary of Timibiriche, he rejoined the band and produced their new album.  He also performed with former band mate Paulina Rubio as part of the Mexican Bicentennial Celebrations.

Solo work
He has released several solo albums since leaving Timbiriche, including the Gold Certified Aquí y Ahora He is the primary songwriter for most of his solo work, and has produced or co-produced his own albums as well.  

He has from time to time lent his voice to broader pop culture activities, such as Mexico's Council for Communications-sponsored campaign singing in the all-star track "Por los Buenos Mexicanos"

Acting and other work
Rubín has made several television appearances as an actor over the course of his career, including small roles in telenovelas Lazos de Amor (1995) and Rebelde (2004), in which he also sang the title theme song.  He starred alongside Ricky Martin in the musical-romance telenovela Alcanzar una estrella II (1991).  For his acting in live theater, he has won two "Premios Heraldos" (the annual pop culture awards sponsored by the Mexican newspaper El Heraldo de Mexico): playing Roger in the Mexican production of Rent, and playing Judas in the Mexican production of Jesus Christ Superstar. He is also frequently invited to appear as a performer or awards presenter at various Spanish-language pop culture ceremonies, in Mexico and in the United States.

Personal life
He married Andrea Legarreta in 2001 in 2023 they separated . They have two daughters: Mia and Nina.

Discography

With Timbiriche
Timbiriche Disco Ruido, 1984
Timbiriche Rock Show, 1985
Timbiriche VII, 1987
Timbiriche VIII & IX, 1988Timbiriche X, 1990

Solo worksLa Casa del Amor, 1993Sueño de Fantasía, 1995Frecuencia Continental, 1997Quadrasónico, 2002Erik, 2004Aquí y Ahora'', 2009

See also
 Sasha, Benny y Erik

References

External links
Erik Rubin on Myspace

1971 births
Living people
Mexican male singers
Timbiriche members
People from Puebla (city)
Mexican people of Ukrainian descent
Mexican male stage actors
Mexican male telenovela actors